Vandna Gupta (born 17 December 1994) is an Indian weightlifter who  placed fourth in the women's 63 kg weight class at the 2014 Commonwealth Games at Glasgow.
Vandana Gupta is from Lucknow and married Sandeep Tomar on 28 February 2017.

References

External links

Living people
1994 births
Indian female weightlifters
Sportswomen from Uttar Pradesh
Sportspeople from Lucknow
21st-century Indian women
20th-century Indian women
Weightlifters from Uttar Pradesh
Weightlifters at the 2014 Commonwealth Games
Commonwealth Games competitors for India